Leptosuchus is an extinct genus of leptosuchomorph phytosaur with a complex taxonomical history. Fossils have been found from the Dockum Group and lower Chinle Formation outcropping in Texas, New Mexico, and Arizona, USA, and date back to the Carnian stage of the Late Triassic.

Currently there are believed to be four species of Leptosuchus. All species share in common a similar position of the temporal arch below the skull roof and a posterior process of the squamosal that extends farther than the paroccipital process. The type species is L. crosbiensis, which was named in 1922 on the basis of material found from Texas. L. adamanensis was first described in 1930 as a species of Machaeroprosopus from the Blue Mesa Member of Petrified Forest National Park, along with the other two species, L. lithodendrorum and L. gregorii. It was not until the publication of a 1995 paper on tetrapods of southwestern United States that these species were recognized as belonging to the genus Leptosuchus. However, because of the distinctive size of the rostral crest in L. gregorii, it was assigned to its own genus, Smilosuchus, in that same paper. Despite this, L. gregorii has recently been seen as belonging to Leptosuchus, as it is believed that the large, complete crest was independently developed in this particular species.<ref>Irmis, R. B. (2005). "The vertebrate fauna of the Upper Triassic Chinle Formation in Northern Arizona". In: Nesbitt, S. J., Parker, W. G. and Irmis, R. B., eds., Guidebook to the Triassic Formations of the Colorado Plateau
in northern Arizona: Geology, Paleontology, and History. Mesa Southwest Museum, Bulletin No. 9.</ref>

The close relation of Leptosuchus and Machaeroprosopus with Rutiodon has led some paleontologists to believe that the prior two were synonymous with Rutiodon, with the latter's name having seniority. Differing features seen in the three phytosaurs have been attributed to sexual dimorphism, differing growth stages, or individual variation, while similarities could be seen in the rostral crest and the position of the nares. Previously it was believed that these were different genera due to the geographical isolation that could be seen in North American phytosaurs; Leptosuchus remains were found primarily in southern localities while Rutiodon remains could be found in more eastern localities. Other studies concluded that it was synonymous with Machaeroprosopus or Phytosaurus. A 1998 study  again found Leptosuchus to be congeneric with Rutiodon, but since then another study has suggested that its type species R. carolinensis, while still very similar to Leptosuchus, is synonymous with Angistorhinus.L. imperfecta is known from a partial skull, UMMP 7523, from same locality as the holotype of L. crosbiensis. It was collected as fragments and reassembled. Long and Murry (1995) considered it to be a nomen nudum, as there was never full formal documentation of this specimen. They referred it to L. adamanensis. Camp (1930) and Ballew (1989) referred it to L. crosbiensis. Stocker (2010) stated that the specimen is phylogenetically redundant and might be synonymous with L. crosbiensis, because its traits are identical to those of L. crosbiensis.

References

External links
Rutiodon in the Paleobiology Database (includes species of Leptosuchus'')

Phytosaurs
Prehistoric reptile genera
Carnian genera
Late Triassic reptiles of North America
Triassic Arizona
Paleontology in Arizona
Triassic geology of New Mexico
Paleontology in New Mexico
Triassic geology of Texas
Paleontology in Texas
Chinle fauna
Fossil taxa described in 1922
Taxa named by Ermine Cowles Case